John Rickards (born 7 January 1978 in Barnet, North London, England) is a British crime writer who signed with Penguin Books at the age of  24.

Life
Before becoming a novelist, Rickards worked as a freelance journalist in the shipping industry on a succession of magazines and news publications, often in an editorial role. He graduated from Cardiff University with a degree in Environmental Engineering, although he has never worked in the field.

He lives in Eastbourne, Sussex with his partner and son.

He also writes under the pseudonym SEAN CREGAN.

His novels feature an ex-FBI agent named Alex Rourke.

Publications

Alex Rourke books
 Winter's End (2004)
 The Touch of Ghosts(2005)
The Darkness Inside (2007)

Anthologies
 Dublin Noir (the short story "Wish", 2006)
 Fuck Noir (the short story "Twenty Dollar Future")

References

External links
 
 Interview on Penguin site
 Interview at GreatWriting.co.uk

English crime fiction writers
English mystery writers
Alumni of Cardiff University
1978 births
Living people
People from Chipping Barnet
People from Eastbourne
English male novelists